Alsophila dregei, synonym Cyathea dregei, (common tree fern or gewone boomvaring in Afrikaans) is a widespread species of tree fern in southern Africa.

Within South Africa, it co-occurs with the indigenous forest tree fern (A. capensis) and the invasive Sphaeropteris cooperi from Australia. Further north, outside of South Africa, it coexists with an additional two tree fern species, A. manniana and A. thomsonii.

This species is locally known as the common South African tree fern or grassland tree fern (in contrast to its relative, the forest tree fern). It is commonly known as the gewone boomvaring in Afrikaans.

Description

Key characteristics

It is a variable species, usually having a thick trunk and dense crown. It is occasionally branched. Fronds are tripinnate (rarely bipinnate) and may reach 3 m in length. They are characteristically large and arching, with the lowest pinnae usually reduced. The upper surface of fronds is glabrate, while the lower surface may be tomentose. The rachis and stipe are brown in colouration and have a rough surface. The stipe is covered in brown scales. Up to twelve sori occur per group per pinnule.

Comparison to other tree ferns

It can be distinguished from the forest tree fern (A. capensis) by its thick trunk, and by its smallest (third level) leaflets. The leaflets of A. dregei have smooth (entire) margins, while those of A. capensis are serrated. Each leaflet of A. dregei has multiple seedcases on its underside, while a leaflet of A. capensis has only one per leaflet. The fronds of A. capensis come off lower, and it usually has several small, residual leaf remnants, which sprout in tufts among its fronds at the top of its stem.

The only other indigenous tree ferns of the southern African region, Alsophila manniana and A. thomsonii, are both native to Zimbabwe. They can be distinguished from A. dregei by stem, stalk and frond appearance. A. manniana has sharp spikes on a slender trunk and frond stems. A. thomsonii has light-coloured, twisted hairs under its leaflets.

The invasive Sphaeropteris cooperi can be distinguished from A. dregei by the hairy white and brown scales on the new unfurling leaf stipes and sometimes by faint serrations on the leaflets.

Taxonomy

The specific epithet dregei commemorates Johann Franz Drège (1794-1881), a German plant collector and explorer who worked extensively in South Africa and who is referred to as Drège when citing botanical names.

Distribution and habitat
It is native to Eswatini, Lesotho, Zimbabwe, Mozambique, Madagascar and South Africa from the Western Cape province to KwaZulu-Natal and Mpumalanga.

Alsophila dregei grows on stream banks, in forest margins and in grasslands. It often grows in the open, in full, direct sunlight, provided there is sufficient moisture. In the wild, it is known to be fire resistant.

Cultivation
Alsophila dregei is rarely common in cultivation as an ornamental plant, especially in South Africa and Australia. Plants should be sheltered and grown in rich humus, with a constant supply of moisture. This species can survive light frosts with little damage.

Gallery

References

Cold-hardy tree ferns: Cyathea dregei

External links
 

dregei
Ferns of Africa
Flora of Southern Africa
Trees of South Africa
Garden plants of Africa
Ornamental trees